William Harmon House may refer to:

William Harmon House (Miles City, Montana), listed on the National Register of Historic Places in Montana
William Harmon House (Lima, New York), listed on the National Register of Historic Places in New York